Joseph Ellsworth Swetland (November 2, 1886 – January 7, 1952) was an American college football player and coach. He served as the head coach at the Stevens Point Normal School—now known as University of Wisconsin–Stevens Point—from 1920 to 1925 and at Northern Normal and Industrial School—now known as Northern State University—in Aberdeen, South Dakota for one season, in 1926. Swetland was also the head basketball coach at Stevens Point Normal from 1920 to 1927 and Northern Normal and Industrial for the 1926–27 season. He died on January 7, 1952, at his home in Kalamazoo, Michigan.

Head coaching record

College football

References

External links
 

1886 births
1952 deaths
Basketball coaches from Wisconsin
Ellendale Dusties football coaches
College men's basketball head coaches in the United States
High school football coaches in Minnesota
High school football coaches in Wisconsin
People from Reedsburg, Wisconsin
Players of American football from Wisconsin
Northern State Wolves football coaches
Northern State Wolves men's basketball coaches
Ripon Red Hawks football players
Wisconsin–Stevens Point Pointers football coaches
Wisconsin–Stevens Point Pointers men's basketball coaches